The women's sanda 60 kilograms competition at the 2018 Asian Games in Jakarta, Indonesia was held from 19 August to 23 August at the JIExpo Kemayoran Hall B3.

Sanda is an unsanctioned fight is a Chinese self-defense system and combat sport. Amateur Sanda allows kicks, punches, knees (not to the head), and throws.

A total of ten competitors from ten different countries competed in this event, limited to fighters whose body weight was less than 60 kilograms.

Cai Yingying from China won the gold medal after beating Shahrbanoo Mansourian of Iran in gold medal bout 2–0. The bronze medal was shared by Suchaya Bualuang from Thailand and Naorem Roshibina Devi of India.

Schedule
All times are Western Indonesia Time (UTC+07:00)

Results
Legend
PD — Won by gap point
RET — Won by retirement

References

External links
Official website

Women's sanda 60 kg